Qapaq (also Romanized as Qāpāq) is a village in Aladagh Rural District, in the Central District of Bojnord County, North Khorasan Province, Iran. A 2006 census records the population as 168 and 35 families.

References 

Populated places in Bojnord County